Jung Ji-Soo (born May 2, 1990) is a South Korean football player who plays for  Phitsanulok in Thai Division 1 League.

His previous club is Busan I'Park in the K-League.

External links 

Profile at goal.com

1990 births
Living people
Association football forwards
South Korean footballers
South Korean expatriate footballers
Busan IPark players
K League 1 players
Korea National League players
South Korean expatriate sportspeople in Portugal
Expatriate footballers in Portugal
South Korean expatriate sportspeople in Thailand
Expatriate footballers in Thailand